The 2022–23 Rahmatganj MFS's season is the 90th competitive highest level season. In addition to domestic league, Rahmatganj MFS are participating on this season's edition of Federation Cup and Independence Cup. This season will cover a period from January 2023 to July 2023.

Players

Current squad

Transfer

In

Out

Competitions

Overall

Overview

Premier League

League table

Results summary

Results by round

Matches

Federation Cup

Group stages

Independence Cup

Group stages

Statistics

Goalscorers

Source: Matches

References

Rahmatganj MFS
Bangladeshi football club records and statistics
Football clubs in Bangladesh
2022 in Bangladeshi football
2023 in Bangladeshi football